Dennis Milton Chambers (born May 9, 1959) is an American drummer. He was inducted into the Modern Drummer Hall of Fame in 2001.

Early life

Chambers was born on May 9, 1959. He began drumming at the age of four years, and was gigging in Baltimore-area nightclubs by the age of six. He was recruited in 1981 by the Sugar Hill Label to be their "house drummer." Chambers played on many Sugar Hill releases. Contrary to popular belief he did not play on "Rapper's Delight" which was revealed in an interview with Drumeo on 8/16/2017.

In an interview by Bonedo in 2011, Chambers was asked who some of his influences and favorite drummers were and he mentioned Clyde Stubblefield, Al Jackson Jr., Steve Gadd, Vinnie Colaiuta, Gary Husband, Jack Dejohnette, Billy Cobham, Buddy Rich, Elvin Jones, Roy Haynes, and Tony Williams.

Career

In 1978 (at 18 years old) he joined Parliament/Funkadelic, and stayed with them until 1985. In 1986 he joined the John Scofield band. Since then he has played with most of the major figures in jazz fusion music.

He has recorded and performed with Tom Coster, John Scofield, George Duke, Victor Wooten, Brecker Brothers, Santana, Parliament/Funkadelic, John McLaughlin, Niacin, Mike Stern, CAB, Greg Howe, and many others.

He has toured extensively with Carlos Santana and makes appearances with his band Niacin.

In December 2004, Chambers was awarded an Honorary Doctorate of Music from Berklee College of Music during the inauguration of former president Roger H. Brown.
In 2013 Chambers recorded the album Groove and More, produced by Lino Nicolosi and Pino Nicolosi, for the Italian company Nicolosi Productions, published by Soul Trade.

Equipment

He plays and endorses Pearl drums, pedals, hardware & racks, Zildjian cymbals, drumsticks & general accessories, LP percussion, Ddrum electronics and Evans Drumheads.

Discography

References

External links 
 DennisChambers.com
 Drummerworld: Dennis Chambers
 Dennis Chambers Interview NAMM Oral History Library (2020)

1959 births
Living people
American jazz drummers
American funk drummers
American male drummers
African-American drummers
Jazz fusion drummers
P-Funk members
Santana (band) members
20th-century American drummers
CAB (band) members
American male jazz musicians
Steps Ahead members